ZIC5 is a member of the Zinc finger of the cerebellum (ZIC) protein family. ZIC5 is located on chromosome 13 in a divergently transcribed gene pair with the closely related gene ZIC2. It has been suggested that this tandem arrangement allows ZIC2 and ZIC5 to share regulatory elements and causes the two genes to have very similar expression patterns.

ZIC5 is classified as a ZIC protein due to conservation of the five C2H2 zinc fingers, which enables the protein to interact with DNA and regulate transcription. Similar to other ZIC family members, ZIC5 is also able to interact with TCF proteins in order to inhibit canonical Wnt signalling. Mutation or loss of ZIC5 has not been associated with any congenital defects in humans. however, loss of Zic5 in mice causes a range of phenotypes including neural crest defects, neural tube defects, hydrocephaly and skeletal defects, indicating multiple functions during early development. Experiments in Xenopus also support the idea that Zic5 can regulate formation of neural crest, suggesting this function is conserved across species.

ZIC5 has recently been found to be regulated by the post-translational modification SUMOylation in order to alter the DNA and protein binding properties of ZIC5 to promote neural crest specification. Several other genes involved in the specification of neural crest, including Pax6, Sox9 and Sox10, also been found to be regulated by the same postranslational modification, suggesting that SUMOylation may have a widespread role in formation of the neural crest.

References